Erskine Theological Seminary is an institution of graduate theological and pastoral education.  The Seminary is based in Due West, South Carolina, United States, and also offers classes at a second degree-granting campus in Columbia, South Carolina. Erskine Seminary operates an extension site in Greenville, South Carolina.  Erskine Seminary is in the conservative Presbyterian tradition, and primarily prepares candidates for ordained Christian ministry, as well as pastoral counselors. The Seminary, founded in 1837, is the graduate arm of  Erskine College, a liberal arts college established in 1839 and affiliated with the Associate Reformed Presbyterian Church. The mission of Erskine Theological Seminary is to prepare "men and women to fulfill the Great Commission of Jesus Christ through theological higher education that is ecclesial, missional, and confessional."

History
On April 22, 2011, five members of the Erskine College and Seminary faculties issued a Good Friday Statement addressing toleration of neo-orthodoxy among the Seminary faculty and supporting their understanding of the Bible as "inerrant in the original autographs" as the official position of the Associate Reformed Presbyterian Church. The Seminary began strengthening conservative and evangelical positions and alliances. Dr. Michael A. Milton, the former chancellor of Reformed Seminary, president of Knox Theological Seminary, Chaplain (Colonel) USA Ret., and a longtime pastor in the Presbyterian Church in America, became Provost in December 2019.

Degree programs
Erskine Theological Seminary offers residential study at its campuses in Due West, Columbia, and Greenville, South Carolina. The Seminary provides study opportunities through residential, blended online and online.

Students may create concentrations in Chaplain Ministries, Pastoral Counseling, and Sports Ministry.
Master of Divinity (M.Div.)
Master of Arts in Practical Ministry (M.A.P.M)
Master of Arts in Theological Studies (M.A.T.S)
Master of Theology (Th.M.)
Doctor of Ministry (D.Min.)

References

External links
Erskine Theological Seminary Official Page
ATS profile of Erskine Theological Seminary

Reformed church seminaries and theological colleges
Presbyterian universities and colleges in the United States
Seminaries and theological colleges in South Carolina
Educational institutions established in 1837
Education in Abbeville County, South Carolina
Buildings and structures in Abbeville County, South Carolina
Erskine College
1837 establishments in South Carolina